A total lunar eclipse took place on Friday, June 4, 1993, the first of two total lunar eclipses in 1993, the second being on Monday, November 29. The Moon was plunged into darkness for 1 hour and 36 minutes, in a deep total eclipse which saw the Moon 56% of its diameter inside the Earth's umbral shadow. The visual effect of this depends on the state of the Earth's atmosphere, but the Moon may have been stained a deep red colour. The partial eclipse lasted for 3 hours and 38 minutes in total. The moon passed through the center of the Earth's shadow.

Visibility 

It was seen completely over Australia, seen rising over Asia on  the evening of Friday 4 June 1993, and setting over Western North and South America on the morning of Friday 4 June 1993.

Related eclipses

Eclipses of 1993 
 A partial solar eclipse (north) on May 21.
 A total lunar eclipse (central, passing north of the axis) on June 4.
 A partial solar eclipse (south) on November 13.
 A total lunar eclipse (south) on November 29.

Lunar year series

Saros series

Half-Saros cycle
A lunar eclipse will be preceded and followed by solar eclipses by 9 years and 5.5 days (a half saros). This lunar eclipse is related to two annular solar eclipses of Solar Saros 137.

See also 
List of lunar eclipses
List of 20th-century lunar eclipses

Notes

External links 
 Saros cycle 130
 

1993-06
1993-06
1993 in science
June 1993 events